Albert Einstein School may refer to: 

 Albert Einstein College of Medicine, the Bronx, New York, a graduate school of Yeshiva University 
 Albert-Einstein-Schule, a former school (grades 5–12) in Bochum, Germany
 Albert Einstein International School of San Pedro Sula, Honduras, a private, non-profit, coeducational day school (pre-kindergarten to grade 12)
 Albert Einstein High School, Montgomery County, Maryland, grades 9-12
 Albert Einstein Academy Charter School, San Diego, California, kindergarten through grade 8
 Albert Einstein Middle School, Shoreline School District, Washington state, grades 7-8
 Albert Einstein School, Ho Chi Minh City, Vietnam, grades 1–12